Philadelphia,  Pennsylvania has a long and rich tradition in professional, semi-professional, amateur, college, and high-school sports.

Sports play a very significant role in the culture of the city and the Greater Philadelphia area. Philadelphia sports fans are considered to be some of the most knowledgeable fans in sports, and are known for their extreme passion for all of their teams. Philadelphia fans, particularly Phillies and Eagles fans, have a  reputation for being the "Meanest Fans in America".

Philadelphia's passionate and knowledgeable fans, combined with the number and extensive history and tradition of the city's teams have many times led the city to be described as the nation's best sports city.<ref>"Philly: the best sports city in America", The Stanford Daily," April 26, 2018</ref>

Philadelphia is one of thirteen cities that hosts teams in the "Big Four" major sports leagues in North America, and Philadelphia is one of just four cities in which one team from every league plays within city limits. These major sports teams are the Philadelphia Phillies of Major League Baseball (MLB), the Philadelphia Eagles of the National Football League (NFL), the Philadelphia 76ers of the National Basketball Association (NBA) and the Philadelphia Flyers of the National Hockey League (NHL). Each team has played in Philadelphia since at least the 1960s, and each team has won at least two championships. Since 2010, the Greater Philadelphia area also has been the home of the Philadelphia Union of Major League Soccer (MLS), making the Philadelphia market one of only nine cities that hosts a team in the five major sports leagues. Prior to the 1980s, Philadelphia was home to several other notable professional franchises, including the Philadelphia Athletics, the Frankford Yellow Jackets, the Philadelphia Warriors, the Philadelphia Quakers, Philadelphia Atoms, and the Philadelphia Field Club.

The Greater Philadelphia area hosts several college sports teams. The Philadelphia Big 5 is an informal association of college basketball schools in Philadelphia, consisting of La Salle University, the University of Pennsylvania, Saint Joseph's University, Temple University, and Villanova University. Those five schools, along with Drexel University, Delaware State University, and the University of Delaware, all represent the Greater Philadelphia area in NCAA Division I, while several other area schools field teams in other divisions of the NCAA. Temple fields the lone Division I FBS football team in the region, though many Philadelphia fans root for other programs, such as the Pennsylvania State University Nittany Lions.

In addition to the major professional and college sports, numerous semi-pro, amateur, community, and high school teams play in Philadelphia. The city hosts numerous sporting events, such as the Penn Relays and the Collegiate Rugby Championship, and Philadelphia has been the most frequent host of the annual Army-Navy football game. Philadelphia has also been the home of several renowned athletes and sports figures. Philly furthermore has played a historically significant role in the development of cricket and extreme wrestling in the United States.

Major league professional teams

Philadelphia has a long history of professional sports teams. Philadelphia is one of six cities that has won at least one championship in the NHL, NFL, MLB, and NBA. Philadelphia's combined total of 19 championships in these leagues ranks seventh among North American cities in total championships.

The Eagles, Phillies, Flyers, and 76ers all play their home games in the South Philadelphia Sports Complex section of the city. The Eagles currently play at Lincoln Financial Field (commonly referred to as "The Linc"), built in 2003. The Phillies play at Citizens Bank Park, which opened in 2004. The Flyers and 76ers share the Wells Fargo Center, opened in 1996. All three venues are within walking distance of NRG Station on SEPTA's Broad Street Line.

Philadelphia has also been home to relocated and defunct franchises. The Philadelphia Athletics (now the Oakland Athletics) of the MLB, the Philadelphia Warriors (now the Golden State Warriors) of the NBA, and the Frankford Yellow Jackets of the NFL each played in Philadelphia for over a decade. Other former Philadelphia teams, such as the Philadelphia Quakers of the NHL, have been more short-lived. Both of the major league teams that relocated (the Warriors and the Athletics) currently play in the San Francisco Bay Area.

In 1980, Philadelphia became the only North American city in which all four major sports teams played for their respective championships in one year (although the Phillies were the only team to win the championship). The Flyers' run to the 2010 Stanley Cup Finals made the city of Philadelphia the first North American city to have all four of its major professional sports league teams play in the league championship finals at least once since 2000, although the Phillies and the Eagles are the only teams to have won a championship since 2000. Philadelphia has had an odd trend of losing championship games during presidential inauguration years; the Sixers, Eagles, Phillies, and Flyers collectively have an 0–8 record in such games since 1977.

In 2011, the Phillies became the first team in the city's major professional sports history to finish the regular season in first place in five consecutive seasons. Two other teams finished first during four consecutive seasons: the 1973–77 Flyers and the 2001–04 Eagles. Five other teams finished first for three seasons in a row: the 1929–31 Athletics, 1947–49 Eagles, 1965–68 Sixers, 1976–78 Phillies, and 1984–87 Flyers.

American football

The Philadelphia Eagles, founded in 1933, are members of the East Division of the National Football Conference (NFC) in the National Football League (NFL). They have operated continuously since then, with the partial exception of the 1943 season, when the Eagles temporarily merged with the Pittsburgh Steelers to become the Steagles. The Eagles have won three pre-Super Bowl era NFL championships: 1948, 1949, 1960, four conference championships, and 13 division championships. They have made three Super Bowl appearances, losing in Super Bowl XV (1980) and Super Bowl XXXIX (2004), and winning Super Bowl LII (2017). The franchise frequently finished at the bottom of the standings in the 1930s, but improved in the 1940s, and became the only NFL team to win back to back championships by shutout (in 1948 and 1949). Though the franchise was average for much of the 1950s, the 1960 championship-winning Eagles were the only team to defeat the Vince Lombardi-coached Packers in a playoff game. The Eagles did not experience much success in the 1960s and early 1970s, but the franchise made four straight playoff appearances starting in 1978, including a Super Bowl appearance in 1980. After another down period, the franchise made the playoffs in six of nine seasons between 1988 and 1996. Andy Reid was hired as head coach in 1999, and across 14 seasons he led the franchise to nine playoff appearances and a run to Super Bowl XXXIX. After Chip Kelly's three-year tenure as head coach, the Eagles hired Doug Pederson, a former offensive coordinator under Reid. The Eagles defeated the New England Patriots in Super Bowl LII. In 1994, defensive end Reggie White, running back Steve Van Buren, and two-way players Chuck Bednarik and Pete Pihos were named to the National Football League 75th Anniversary All-Time Team.

The city's first professional football team was the Frankford Yellow Jackets. Originally a community athletic-association team in the Frankford neighborhood of Northeast Philadelphia dating back to 1899, the club became one of the early NFL clubs in 1924. The Yellow Jackets won the NFL championship in 1926. Its home field was Frankford Stadium (also called Yellow Jacket Field). Financial troubles brought on by the Great Depression and a fire at Frankford Stadium led to the club disbanding after the 1931 season. Pro Football Hall of Famers Guy Chamberlin and William R. Lyman both played for the Yellow Jackets.

The greater Philadelphia area has had four other football teams that played in the NFL or in leagues that attempted to compete with the NFL. The Pottsville Maroons, a member of the National Football League, played in nearby Pottsville during the 1920s. In 1925, the Maroons were briefly suspended from the NFL for playing an unauthorized exhibition game at Philadelphia's Shibe Park. The team moved to Boston in 1929, but folded at the end of the season. The Philadelphia Quakers played one season in Philadelphia as part of the American Football League, a fledgling league intent on challenging the NFL as the premier football league in the country. The team took its name from the Union Quakers of Philadelphia, a local club which had been denied entry into the American Professional Football Association (as the NFL was known before 1922). The AFL Quakers won the league championship in 1926, giving Philadelphia two football championships in one year, as the Frankford Yellow Jackets won the 1926 NFL title. However, both the AFL and the Quakers folded after just one season of existence. The Philadelphia Bell was a franchise of the World Football League, which operated from 1974 to 1975 and attempted to challenge the NFL's dominance. The league was founded by Gary Davidson, who had also led the founding of World Hockey Association and the American Basketball Association, but the WFL folded after only two years and no teams were absorbed into the NFL. The Bell played its home games in JFK Stadium, and they employed the first African-American head coach in modern professional football history (retired Hall of Fame safety Willie Wood). The Philadelphia Stars were a football team in the USFL, a league that attempted to compete with the NFL for three seasons in the 1980s. The Stars won the league championship in their second season in Philadelphia in 1983−84, but the franchise moved to Baltimore for the league's final season. The team was coached by Jim Mora, who went on to a successful coaching career in the NFL, and among its players were future NFL Pro Bowlers Sam Mills and Sean Landeta (who later played for the Philadelphia Eagles). Unlike the NFL, the league played in the spring and summer, but it folded after a failed antitrust lawsuit and an aborted attempt to directly compete with the NFL in the fall.

Baseball

The city's sole existing Major League Baseball (MLB) team is the Philadelphia Phillies. Founded in 1883, the team is the oldest continuous, one-name, one-city franchise in all of professional American sports. The Phillies have won seven National League pennants and eleven NL East division titles. In 2007, the Phillies lost a game for the 10,000th time in franchise history; according to the Elias Sports Bureau, no professional sports franchise in any sport has lost more games. For its first 30 years, the franchise often finished in the middle of the National League. Led by pitcher Grover Cleveland Alexander, the franchise appeared in the 1915 World Series and made strong finishes in 1916 and 1917. After trading Alexander in 1917, the franchise had one of the worst stretches in professional sports history, as it managed just one winning season between 1918 and 1948. The "Whiz Kid" Phillies, led by pitcher Robin Roberts, reached the 1950 World Series, but the team was swept by the New York Yankees. The team finished towards the middle of the pack for much of the 1950s and 1960s. After a down period in the early 1970s, third baseman Mike Schmidt and pitcher Steve Carlton led the Phillies to six playoff appearances in eight years. The Phillies won their first World Series in 1980, defeating the Kansas City Royals in six games. The Phillies also appeared in the 1983 World Series, but lost to the Baltimore Orioles. The franchise had just one winning season between 1987 and 2000, although the 1993 Phillies appeared in the 1993 World Series, losing to the Toronto Blue Jays. The franchise experienced a resurgence starting in 2001, though it did not make the playoffs until 2007. From 2007 to 2011, the Phillies made the playoffs for five straight seasons, winning the 2008 World Series over the Tampa Bay Rays and also appearing in the 2009 World Series. Since 2013, the team has finished below .500 for six straight seasons. After 11 years without a playoff berth, the Phillies reached the 2022 World Series, losing to the Houston Astros in six games.

For the first half of the 20th century, Philadelphia had two Major League Baseball franchises. The Philadelphia Athletics were founded in 1901 as one of the eight charter franchises of the American League. The team won the American League pennant nine times while in Philadelphia, including a 1902 pennant victory that occurred before the start of the modern World Series. The Athletics declined after their victory in the 1930 World Series, and usually finished below .500 in the 1930s, 1940s, and 1950s. The Athletics were one of several MLB teams that relocated in the 1950s and 1960s, moving to Kansas City after the 1954 season. Having played 53 seasons in Philadelphia, the Athletics are the sixth-longest tenured team in major North American professional sports to relocate, behind four other baseball teams (the Braves, Giants, Dodgers, and Senators) and one football team (the Chargers). The Athletics would later relocate to Oakland after the 1967 season, becoming the Oakland Athletics. Philadelphia Athletics players such as Lefty Grove, Jimmie Foxx, and Al Simmons have been inducted into the Philadelphia Sports Hall of Fame, as has long-time manager and owner Connie Mack, who holds the record for most games managed, won, and lost. While the Athletics played in Philadelphia, they frequently played the Phillies in exhibition games known as the City Series. However, the teams never met in the World Series, and did not play each other in the regular season until 2003 (after the introduction of interleague play).

The first game in the history of Major League Baseball was played in Philadelphia, on Saturday, April 22, 1876, at the Jefferson Street Grounds. The Boston Red Caps defeated the Philadelphia Athletics (NL), 6–5, in the inaugural game of the National League. These Athletics (also known as Athletic of Philadelphia) were formed in 1860, and played in the National Association of Base Ball Players (NABBP), then the National Association (NA), and finally the National League (NL; for only one year). The Athletics won the inaugural National Association title, making the franchise the winner of arguably the first title in major league history. After the end of the 1876 season, the franchise folded, having been expelled from the National League for refusing to make a late-season road trip. Three other franchises would later use the name "Athletics", including the now–Oakland Athletics. Though the 1860–76 Athletics were the first prominent Philadelphia baseball club, the history of baseball in Philadelphia extends to even before the Athletics, as Philadelphians were playing town ball by the 1820s.

Basketball

The Philadelphia 76ers (commonly referred to as the Sixers) represent Philadelphia in the NBA. The franchise, which plays in the Atlantic Division, has won three NBA championships, nine conference titles, and five division titles. As of 2014, the Sixers have the third most wins in NBA history. The franchise began in 1946, as the Syracuse Nationals in the National Basketball League (NBL). In 1949, the Nationals were one of seven NBL teams that merged with the BAA to form the NBA. The franchise won its first championship in 1955, as the Nationals. After moving to Philadelphia in 1963 and being renamed the 76ers, the franchise acquired Wilt Chamberlain and experienced a great period of success. The team won a then-record 68 games and the championship in the 1966–1967 season, making it the only team besides the Boston Celtics to win an NBA championship in the 1960s. The franchise missed the playoffs for four consecutive seasons in the early 1970s, and the 1972–1973 Sixers hold the NBA record for most losses in one season, with 73. However, the team quickly bounced back after it acquired Julius Erving, and Erving and Moses Malone led the Sixers to a championship in 1983. The franchise continued to experience success until the early 1990s, when it traded Charles Barkley. The Sixers missed the playoffs for seven straight seasons until the emergence of Allen Iverson, who led the team to the 2001 finals. The team hovered around .500 for most of the 2000s decade, and missed the playoffs from 2013 to 2017. In 1996, the NBA named the 1967 and 1983 championship-winning teams two of the ten greatest teams in NBA history.

The Philadelphia Warriors played in Philadelphia from 1946 to 1962 before moving to San Francisco and becoming the Golden State Warriors. The Philadelphia Warriors won two championships and three conference titles during that time. The team won its first championship in 1946–47, the inaugural season of the Basketball Association of America (BAA). Following the merger between the BAA and the National Basketball League that formed the NBA, the Philadelphia Warriors won their second title in 1956. While a member of the Philadelphia Warriors, Wilt Chamberlain set several NBA records; scoring 100 points in a game against the New York Knicks is perhaps his most well-known achievement. The Philadelphia Sports Hall of Fame has inducted Paul Arizin, Neil Johnston, Joe Fulks, and other people associated with the Philadelphia Warriors. The Warriors franchise moved to San Francisco in 1962 and became the Golden State Warriors. The Warriors and Sixers/Nationals have met in the playoffs ten times, most recently in the 1967 NBA Finals. Philadelphia went one season without an NBA franchise before the Syracuse Nationals moved to Philadelphia and became the Philadelphia 76ers. In the lone season that Philadelphia lacked an NBA franchise, the American Basketball League, which had been started in 1961 by Abe Saperstein as an attempt to compete with the NBA, moved a franchise to region. Both the team (the Philadelphia Tapers) and the league folded in December 1962.

Ice hockey

 
The Philadelphia Flyers were one of six teams that the National Hockey League (NHL) added as part of the 1967 NHL expansion, which ended the Original Six era. The Flyers play in the Metropolitan Division and have won two championships: the 1974 and 1975 Stanley Cups. The Flyers were the first non-Original Six team to win the Stanley Cup since the Montreal Maroons won the cup in 1935. The Flyers have won eight conference championships and 16 division championships. The Flyers were particularly successful in the 1970s: the team won back-to-back Stanley Cups, appeared in a third consecutive Stanley Cup Finals in 1976, defeated HC CSKA Moscow (the Soviet "Red Army team") in a famous exhibition game, and, in the 1979–80 season, set the record for the longest unbeaten streak in NHL history. The franchise experienced success even after the retirement of Hall of Famer Bobby Clarke, making Stanley Cup appearances in 1985 and 1987. After a down period in the early 1990s, Hart Trophy-winner Eric Lindros helped lead the team to the 1997 Stanley Cup Finals and a string of playoff appearances. The team made another Finals appearance in 2010, but lost in six games to the Chicago Blackhawks. As of 2016, the Flyers have accrued the second-highest points percentage of all NHL franchises, behind only the Montreal Canadiens. The 1970s Flyers earned the nickname "Broad Street Bullies" for their aggressive style of play, and the nickname is still applied to the franchise. Flyers enforcer Dave Schultz holds the record for most penalty minutes in a season, with 472.

Philadelphia has had only brief experiences with top-level hockey aside from the Flyers. The Philadelphia Quakers were a National Hockey League team that played only one full season, 1930–31, at the Philadelphia Arena. The franchise, which had moved from Pittsburgh, folded after its only season in Philadelphia, during which the club set a record for the lowest winning percentage and the longest losing streak in league history—records that stood for over forty years. The Quakers were one of several NHL teams that folded in the 1930s, leaving the NHL with just six teams between 1942 and the 1967 expansion that brought the NHL to Philadelphia and five other American cities. Len Peto attempted to bring the Montreal Maroons to Philadelphia in the 1940s, but the lack of both league support and a suitable arena prevented the Maroons from playing in Philadelphia. The Philadelphia Blazers played for one season in the World Hockey Association, a league that attempted to challenge the NHL's supremacy, using a rink constructed in Convention Hall at the Civic Center (later used by the Philadelphia Firebirds of the North American Hockey League and the American Hockey League). After the 1972–73 season, the Blazers moved to Vancouver and then Calgary, but the franchise folded in 1977. Another World Hockey Association franchise, the Jersey Knights, moved in November 1973 to the Cherry Hill Arena in Cherry Hill, New Jersey, and then relocated to San Diego before the start of the 1974–75 season.

Soccer

The Philadelphia Union is a Major League Soccer (MLS) team that plays in the Eastern Conference. The franchise began play in 2010. The Union play at Subaru Park, a soccer-specific stadium located in Chester, Pennsylvania. The Sons of Ben is an independent supporters group that helped bring the Union to the Philadelphia area and continues to support the Union. The Union's top affiliate is Philadelphia Union II. Originally known as Bethlehem Steel FC as a tribute to the early 20th century soccer powerhouse, the team began play in 2015 in the second-level United Soccer League, now known as the USL Championship. Steel FC played its first four seasons at Goodman Stadium in Bethlehem, Pennsylvania, but moved to Subaru Park for at least the 2019 season because Goodman Stadium no longer meets league stadium requirements. Steel FC was renamed Union II in advance of the 2020 season. They have also reached the U.S. Open Cup final three times, in 2014, 2015 and 2018, losing two games at home (in extra time in 2014 to the Seattle Sounders and after penalties in 2015 to Sporting Kansas City) and once on the road (in 2018 away to the Houston Dynamo). In 2020, the Union won the Supporters' Shield, given to the team in MLS with the best regular season record, the first major trophy in the team's history.

The original Bethlehem Steel F.C. was one of the most successful early American soccer clubs; the club was sponsored by the Bethlehem Steel Corporation and played from 1907 to 1930. The club won league championships in two semi-professional leagues, the AAFBA and the NAFBL. For the inaugural 1921–1922 season of the professional American Soccer League, Bethlehem Steel F.C. moved to Philadelphia and competed as the Philadelphia Field Club. The team won the first American Soccer League championship, but moved back to Bethlehem and reverted to its original name. Three other franchises also competed as the Philadelphia Field Club, giving Philadelphia continuous representation in the ASL between 1921 and 1929 (although the second incarnation of Philadelphia Field Club changed its name to the Philadelphia Celtic for one season). During the 1924–1925 season, Fleisher Yarn joined the ASL, giving Philadelphia two teams. Excluding the first incarnation of the Philadelphia Field Club, the Philadelphia ASL teams experienced little success. The ASL was one of the most popular sports leagues in the country before it dissolved due to the onset of the Great Depression and disagreements with the United States Football Association and FIFA. After returning to Bethlehem, Bethlehem Steel F.C. won a second ASL championship in 1927, and then played in the Eastern Professional Soccer League from 1928 to 1929, winning the league championship in both seasons. The EPSL and ASL merged after the 1929 season, but Bethlehem Steel FC folded in 1930 and the ASL collapsed in 1933. Bethlehem Steel F.C. won the US Open Cup five times, which remains a record (shared with Maccabi Los Angeles). The club also won the American Cup six times. Hall of Fame Bethlehem Steel players include Jock Ferguson, Robert Millar, Harry Ratican, Tommy Fleming, and Archie Stark, whose international record of 70 goals in one season stood for 87 years before it was broken by Lionel Messi in 2012. In 2013, the Philadelphia Union unveiled a third uniform that pays homage to Bethlehem Steel F.C.

Following the collapse of the ASL, soccer in the United States declined in popularity and the country lacked a major professional soccer league. In 1967, two major soccer leagues, the National Professional Soccer League (NPSL) and the United Soccer Association (USA), both began play. The Philadelphia Spartans, owned by Pittsburgh Steelers owner Art Rooney, played at Temple Stadium for the NPSL's lone season. After one season, both leagues merged to form the FIFA-backed, major professional North American Soccer League (NASL). The Spartans did not make the jump to the NASL, but two different franchises later represented Philadelphia. The Philadelphia Atoms played from 1973 to 1976, winning the Soccer Bowl in their inaugural 1973 season. Philadelphia goalkeeper and Pennsylvania native Bob Rigby became the first soccer player to be featured on the cover of Sports Illustrated following the club's championship. The Atoms folded after the 1976 season, having been bought by Mexican owners whose plans to move the team to San Antonio were not approved by the league. The Philadelphia Fury played from 1978 to 1980, but were bought by Molson Brewery and moved to Montreal to become the Manic. The Atoms and the Fury both played at Veterans Stadium, though the Atoms played their final season in Philadelphia at Franklin Field. The NASL folded in 1984, leaving the United States without a top-level soccer league until Major League Soccer (MLS) began play in 1996. 

Philadelphia is one of eleven US cities which will host matches during the 2026 FIFA World Cup. 

Timeline of franchisesThe timeline includes Philadelphia franchises that played in major professional sports leagues after 1900. Note that the Philadelphia Field Club was actually four different franchises.    

Major professional championships, awards, and events

Major professional championships
Championships won by Philadelphia teams in major professional league sports (MLB, NFL, NBA, NHL, MLS, NASL):

Championship game/series appearances

Awards

MVPs
The following Philadelphia players won the regular season most valuable player award of the NFL (AP), MLB, NHL, NBA, or MLS. Note that MLB confers an MVP award to one player in the American League and one player in the National League.

 Eddie Collins, AL, 1914
 Mickey Cochrane, AL, 1928
 Lefty Grove, AL, 1931
 Chuck Klein, NL, 1932
 Jimmie Foxx, AL, 1932, 1933

 Jim Konstanty, NL, 1950
 Bobby Shantz, AL, 1952
 Norm Van Brocklin, NFL, 1960
 Wilt Chamberlain, NBA, 1960, 1966, 1967, 1968
 Bobby Clarke, NHL, 1973, 1975, 1976

 Mike Schmidt, NL, 1980, 1981, 1986
 Julius Erving, NBA, 1981
 Moses Malone, NBA, 1983
 Eric Lindros, NHL, 1995
 Allen Iverson, NBA, 2001

 Ryan Howard, NL, 2006
 Jimmy Rollins, NL, 2007
 Bryce Harper, NL, 2021

Other awards

Major sports events held in Philadelphia
Philadelphia has hosted the following all-star games and drafts, including the first NFL Draft:

Rivalries
Philadelphia has rivalries with three of the four other major cities in the "Northeast megalopolis", particularly New York City, as well as a long history with an instate rival, Pittsburgh. Philadelphia teams also compete with teams from New York City and Pittsburgh for fans in New Jersey and Pennsylvania. In addition to regional rivalries, teams from Philadelphia have a number of other rivalries with teams from other cities.

New York City

As the two largest cities in the United States for much of the nation's history, New York and Philadelphia have a historical rivalry that has continued in the world of sports. There are intra-division rivalries among teams from New York City and Philadelphia in each of the five major leagues, as seen in the rivalries between the New York Mets and the Philadelphia Phillies in the National League East, the New York Giants and the Philadelphia Eagles in the NFC East, the New York Knicks and the Philadelphia 76ers in the NBA's Atlantic Division, the New York Rangers and the Philadelphia Flyers in the National Hockey League's Metropolitan Division, and the Philadelphia Union and the New York Red Bulls in Major League Soccer's Eastern Conference. The Flyers also have an intense rivalry with the New Jersey Devils (who play in the New York metropolitan area) and were major rivals with the New York Islanders in the 1970s and 1980s. The Brooklyn Nets and the 76ers are also divisional rivals, as both teams play in the Atlantic Division. The Phillies and Yankees play each other very rarely, but the teams met in the 1950 World Series and the 2009 World Series. The New York Jets and the Eagles have only played each other ten times, with the Eagles winning every game.

Pittsburgh

Philadelphia and Pittsburgh are the two major cities of Pennsylvania and the only two cities in the state with major professional sports franchises, and the teams of the two cities have had strong rivalries in the NHL, MLB, and NFL. Perhaps the strongest current rivalry is between the Philadelphia Flyers and the Pittsburgh Penguins, both of which play in the Metropolitan Division of the NHL. The rivalry is generally considered to be one of the fiercest in the NHL.

Although not major rivals since the 1994 MLB divisional realignment, the Pittsburgh Pirates and Phillies had historically been heated rivals in the National League, and frequently competed for the National League East division title. The Phillies and Pirates still play regularly, but are no longer in the same division. The Pirates earned their name from a 19th-century incident with the Philadelphia Athletics; after the Pirates signed second baseman Lou Bierbauer, the Athletics protested that Pittsburgh's actions were "piratical."

The Pittsburgh Steelers and the Eagles both came into the NFL during the 1933 season. Between 1945 and 1970, the Eagles and Steelers played each other every year, and the two teams met in a one-game playoff in 1947. However, the Steelers moved to the American Football Conference as part of the 1970 AFL-NFL Merger, and the Eagles and Steelers only play each other every four years.

There is also a spirited rivalry between Pittsburgh and Philadelphia at both the University of Pittsburgh and Penn State University, as there are many students from both cities at both state-related schools.

Boston

Philadelphia and Boston have historically had strong rivalries in the NBA and NHL. The 76ers have a long rivalry with the Boston Celtics and both currently compete in the Atlantic Division. The two franchises have met each other in the NBA playoffs more than any other pair of franchises. Sixers guard Andrew Toney earned the appellation "The Boston Strangler" for his clutch play against the Boston Celtics in the 1980s. The Flyers have met the Boston Bruins seven times in the NHL playoffs, including a stretch where they met four out of five years, one of those meetings being the 1974 Stanley Cup Finals. The Philadelphia Phillies and the Boston Red Sox are interleague rivals, and the two franchises met in the 1915 World Series. The Eagles and the New England Patriots rarely play, but the teams met in both Super Bowl XXXIX and Super Bowl LII. The Union and the New England Revolution both play in the MLS's Eastern Conference.

Washington, D.C.

Philadelphia and Washington, D.C. have teams in the same division in the NFL, NHL, MLB, and MLS. The Eagles and the Washington Commanders have a long history, having (almost always) competed in the same division since 1933. The Flyers and the Washington Capitals both play in the Metropolitan Division; the rivals have met five times in the NHL playoffs. The Washington Nationals franchise (including their predecessor, the Montreal Expos) and the Phillies have competed in the NL East since 1969. The Union have developed an intraconference rivalry with D.C. United. The Washington Wizards and the 76ers also both play in the NBA's Eastern Conference, and the two teams met in the NBA playoffs five times, most recently in 2021. They also met in the 1971 playoffs, when the current Washington franchise was based in Baltimore.

Other rivalries
Philadelphia teams have rivalries with teams from outside of the Northeast. There is a passionate NFC East rivalry between the Eagles and the Cowboys, with a number of stories and memorable events surrounding the rivalry. The 76ers enjoy an interconference rivalry with the Los Angeles Lakers. The two teams met in the NBA Finals in 1980, 1982, 1983, and 2001. The Phillies have developed a rivalry with the Atlanta Braves. The teams met in the 1993 NLCS, and the two franchises are the most frequent winners of the NL East.

Other professional teams

American football

The Philadelphia Soul were an Arena Football League (AFL) franchise founded in 2004. The team played in the Wells Fargo Center. The Soul won ArenaBowl XXII in 2008 before the league formally disbanded in 2009. The Soul returned in 2010 after the AFL restarted its operations as a new entity. The Soul won four conference championships and four division championships. The Soul won back-to-back championships in 2017 (ArenaBowl XXIX) and 2018 (ArenaBowl XXX), making it a total of three ArenaBowl Championships. The Soul disbanded in 2019 when the AFL folded again.

Philadelphia hosts some women's football teams as well. The city's first women's tackle football team was the Philadelphia Liberty Belles, which played in the National Women's Football Association and the Independent Women's Football League from 2001 to 2004. A second incarnation of the Liberty Belles was founded in 2009, and plays in the Women's Football Alliance. The Philadelphia Firebirds, established in 2003, play in the Independent Women's Football League. The Philadelphia Passion played in the Legends Football League.

Other football teams in the city have folded. In 1902 the owners of the three MLB teams in Pennsylvania founded the National Football League (a league unrelated to the modern NFL). The league consisted of the Phillies, Athletics, and the Pittsburgh Stars, and lasted only one year. Many of the players from the Philadelphia teams played for the "New York Philadelphians" during the 1902 World Series of Football. Other early football clubs include the Union Club of Phoenixville, Conshohocken Athletic Club, Union Quakers of Philadelphia, and Holmesburg Athletic Club. The Clifton Heights Orange & Black competed from 1921 to 1932, and played in the short-lived Eastern League of Professional Football. The Philadelphia Bulldogs played in the Continental Football League from 1965 to 1966. They won the 1966 championship. The Pottstown Firebirds competed in the Atlantic Coast Football League from 1968 to 1970; the franchise was an affiliate of the Philadelphia Eagles.

Baseball

Although the Philadelphia Phillies are the only active major league professional baseball team in Philadelphia, other professional baseball teams play in the Delaware Valley. The Reading Fightin Phils are the Double-A affiliate of the Philadelphia Phillies. The club was established in 1967 and plays in the Double-A Northeast. Notable alumni of the Fightin Phils include Mike Schmidt, Ryne Sandberg, and Jimmy Rollins. The Wilmington Blue Rocks are a Kansas City Royals affiliate that play in Wilmington, Delaware. Three other Phillies affiliates play in Pennsylvania or New Jersey: the Triple-A Lehigh Valley IronPigs play in Allentown, Pennsylvania, and the Class A Jersey Shore BlueClaws play in Lakewood Township, New Jersey. After the 2021 restructuring of Minor League Baseball (MiLB), the Trenton Thunder, in Trenton, New Jersey and the Williamsport Crosscutters in Williamsport, Pennsylvania are unaffiliated collegiate summer baseball teams.

During the 19th century, Philadelphia was home to numerous franchises that played in various leagues that did not last into the 20th century. Many of these leagues are considered to be "major leagues" by baseball historians and record keepers. Three different franchises, none directly related to each other or the current Oakland Athletics franchise, played in Philadelphia during the 19th century. The original Philadelphia Athletics (also known as Athletic of Philadelphia) were formed in 1860, and played in the National Association and the National League. Another Athletics franchise played in the American Association from 1882 to 1890, while a third Athletics franchise (also known as the Quakers) played one season in the Players' League and one season in the American Association. The Philadelphia White Stockings and the Philadelphia Centennials played in the National Association during the 1870s. Joe Borden of the White Stockings pitched the first no-hitter in professional history. The Philadelphia Keystones and the Wilmington Quicksteps both played parts of the Union Association's lone season in 1884.

Before the integration of Major League Baseball following World War II, Philadelphia was the home of numerous Negro league teams. The Philadelphia Pythians played from 1867 to 1887, and were one of the top early black baseball clubs. Shortly after the end of the Civil War, the Pythians tried to join the National League but were denied membership. The Philadelphia Giants were a Negro league team that played from 1902 to 1911. The Hilldale Club played as an independent and in several leagues from 1910 to 1932. Hilldale won the Negro World Series in 1925. The Philadelphia Tigers played in the Eastern Colored League in 1928. Two franchises played in the second incarnation of the Negro National League: the Philadelphia Stars played from 1934 to 1948, while the Bacharach Giants played in the league in 1934. The Stars won the Negro National League championship in 1934.

Basketball
The Delaware Blue Coats are the NBA G League affiliate of the Philadelphia 76ers. Since the 2018–19 season, the franchise has played at the 76ers Fieldhouse in Wilmington, Delaware. The Blue Coats franchise is named in honor of the 198th Signal Battalion, which fought in the American Revolutionary War. The Blue Coats were founded as the Utah Flash in 2007, but the Flash suspended operations in 2011. The Sixers acquired the franchise in 2013 and renamed it as the Delaware 87ers; the team assumed its current name upon its move to Wilmington. Between 2013 and 2018, the 87ers played in Newark, Delaware. NBA players such as Kendall Marshall, Sean Kilpatrick, and Jordan McRae have played for the Blue Coats or the 87ers.

The Philadelphia area had three teams that played in the American Basketball League; the league was the product of an early attempt at forming a top-level national professional basketball league. The Philadelphia Warriors played in the ABL in the 1920s. The Philadelphia Sphas played from 1917 to 1949, winning seven ABL championships. With the rise of the NBA, the ABL ceased to be a major league, and the Sphas became the touring opponent of the Harlem Globetrotters. The Sphas were renamed the Washington Generals in 1952. Wilmington also had a team in the ABL: the Wilmington Bombers played in the league in the 1940s.

The Philadelphia area has hosted numerous other defunct basketball teams. Two franchises named the Bullets played in Camden and Cherry Hill in the 1960s and 1970s. The Philadelphia Kings played in the Continental Basketball Association in the league's 1980–1981 season. The Philadelphia Aces played in the United States Basketball League from 1987 to 1990. The Philadelphia Spirit played in the United States Basketball League from 1991 to 1992. The Philadelphia Rage moved from Richmond, Virginia in 1997 and played a year and a half in the American Basketball League before the league folded during the 1998 season. The Philadelphia Fusion, formerly the Jersey Squires, was an American Basketball Association team that folded in February 2005.

 Esports 
In 2017, Blizzard Entertainment announced their professional esports league for their game Overwatch, the Overwatch League (OWL). Philadelphia is home to one of the league's teams, the Philadelphia Fusion. The Overwatch League differs from traditional esports, with a set of permanent teams and regular season play, compared to the use of promotion and relegation commonly used in other esports leagues. They moved to Seoul and rebranded as the Infernal in December 2022.

Ice hockey

Both of the Flyers's minor league affiliates play in eastern Pennsylvania. The Lehigh Valley Phantoms of the American Hockey League (AHL) are the top minor league affiliate of the Flyers. The Phantoms have played in Allentown, Pennsylvania, since 2014. From 1996 to 2009, the Phantoms played in the Spectrum and were known as the Philadelphia Phantoms. The franchise won the Calder Cup in 1998 and 2005. The Reading Royals are the ECHL affiliate of the Philadelphia Flyers. The franchise was founded in 1991 as the Columbus Chill, but moved to Reading in 2001. The Royals won the league championship for the first time in 2013. The Flyers have had other affiliates in eastern Pennsylvania and New Jersey. The Trenton Titans of Trenton, New Jersey, played in the ECHL from 1999 to 2013, and served as the affiliate of the Flyers before they were bought by the New Jersey Devils. The Hershey Bears of Hershey, Pennsylvania, are the oldest continuously operating professional hockey franchise outside of the NHL's Original Six. The Bears served as the AHL affiliate of the Flyers for parts of the 1980s and 1990s.

Philadelphia has had several minor league hockey teams play in the city and the surrounding area. The Philadelphia Arrows were the first hockey franchise in city history, playing in the Canadian-American Hockey League from 1927 to 1935. The franchise changed its name to the Philadelphia Ramblers before the 1935–36 season and joined the American Hockey League, where it won the 1936 league championship (the year before the league introduced the Calder Cup). The team acted as the primary affiliate of the New York Rangers from 1935 to 1941. The Philadelphia Falcons played in the Eastern Hockey League (EHL) from 1942 to 1946, before jumping to the American Hockey League and playing as the Philadelphia Rockets from 1946 to 1949. Another franchise named the Ramblers played in the EHL from 1955 to 1964; the Ramblers moved to Cherry Hill, New Jersey and played as the Jersey Devils from 1964 to 1973. A previous EHL Cherry Hill team named the Jersey Larks had played one season in 1960–61. The Philadelphia Firebirds were a minor league hockey team that played in the Philadelphia Civic Center from 1974 to 1979. They played in the North American Hockey League (NAHL) from 1974 to 1977, winning the league championship in 1976. When the NAHL folded in 1977, they joined the AHL. The team moved to Syracuse in 1979, but folded in 1980. Another short-lived team that played in the Centrum (the renamed Cherry Hill Arena) was the Jersey Aces, which started the 1979–80 Northeastern Hockey League season in Cherry Hill but moved mid-season, playing the final 18 games of its season in Hampton, Virginia, where it continued operating until 1981.
In 2017, and starting again in 2022, the Philadelphia Rebels play NAHL tier-2 junior ice hockey.

Lacrosse

Philadelphia has hosted several professional lacrosse teams. The original Philadelphia Wings won the National Lacrosse League (NLL) title six times, in 1989, 1990, 1994, 1995, 1998, and 2001. They were the longest tenured team in one location in the NLL, but relocated after the 2014 season to become the New England Black Wolves. In 2018, a new Philadelphia Wings, playing at the Wells Fargo Center, was launched in the NLL and named itself after the previous team.

Another lacrosse franchise, the Philadelphia Barrage, played in Major League Lacrosse (MLL) from 2004 to 2008. The team won the league championship in three out of the five years they played in Philadelphia, but the franchise folded after the 2008 season. The Barrage were resurrected for the 2020 season, but MLL was merged into the Premier Lacrosse League at the end of the season and the Barrage were not included as a team in the merged league. The PLL uses a tour-based model unique in North American professional sports, in which each round of matches is played at a separate location. Since the league had 8 teams in its most recent 2022 season, this allows all teams to play at each tour stop. The semifinals and championship game are held at two additional tour stops. In the 2022 season, Subaru Park hosted the PLL championship game.

Soccer

Philadelphia has been the home of numerous defunct professional soccer teams. The Philadelphia Phillies and other baseball clubs established the American League of Professional Football, the first professional soccer league in the United States. The league only played for one season in 1894. Arthur Irwin, the manager of the Phillies baseball team, served as the league president. Other early Philadelphia-area soccer clubs include Philadelphia Hibernian, Centennial F.C., Philadelphia Merchant Ship, Disston A.A., Victor F.C. Numerous teams competed in the defunct second American Soccer League, including the Philadelphia Ukrainians, Uhrik Truckers, Philadelphia Nationals and the Philadelphia Spartans. The Philadelphia Ukrainians won the US Open Cup four times, while the Uhrik Truckers won the trophy once. Walter Bahr, a Philadelphia native and the captain of the 1950 U.S. national team that defeated England, played for the Ukrainians and the Nationals. The Philadelphia Fever were an indoor team that played in the original Major Indoor Soccer League from 1978 to 1982. The Philadelphia KiXX were an indoor team that played from 1995 to 2010  in the National Indoor Soccer League and the Major Indoor Soccer League. The KiXX won the championship in 2002 and 2007, but disbanded in 2010. Philadelphia has also been home to defunct women's soccer teams.

Philadelphia has had two defunct women's teams that played at the top level of the United States soccer pyramid. The Philadelphia Charge played in the Women's United Soccer Association from 2000 to 2003, while the Philadelphia Independence played the 2010 and 2011 seasons in Women's Professional Soccer, reaching (and losing in) the championship game each year before the league folded in 2012. Philadelphia has not yet had a team play in the National Women's Soccer League, which is currently the top women's league in the United States. However, the current NWSL side NJ/NY Gotham FC, normally based at Red Bull Arena in New York City's New Jersey suburbs, has played one home game per season at Subaru Park since 2021. Presumably, this arrangement is intended to develop a fanbase in southern New Jersey.

Collegiate sports

The city of Philadelphia is the home of nine NCAA schools. Drexel University, La Salle University, the University of Pennsylvania, Saint Joseph's University, and Temple University are NCAA Division I schools. Three schools compete in NCAA Division II: Chestnut Hill College, Holy Family University, and Thomas Jefferson University (known for sports purposes as "Jefferson"). Other schools in the Delaware Valley CSA are also NCAA members, including Division I schools Villanova University, Delaware State University, and the University of Delaware.The following table shows all NCAA Division I schools in the Delaware Valley and all NCAA schools in Philadelphia.American football

The Army-Navy football game — an annual college football game between the rival service academies, the United States Military Academy (West Point) and the United States Naval Academy (Annapolis) — has been held more often in Philadelphia (which is located approximately midway between the two schools) than in all other locations put together.  Eleven of the past 15 Army–Navy Games have been held in Philadelphia.

Temple University, which began playing football in 1894, fields the only Division I FBS football team in the Delaware Valley. Temple, one of many schools that switched conferences in the early 2010s, joined the Big East Conference in 2012; when the Big East split a year later, Temple moved its entire athletic program to the Big East's football-sponsoring successor, the American Athletic Conference. Although Temple is the lone FBS school in the region, the Pennsylvania State University Nittany Lions are the most popular college football team in Philadelphia and the Delaware Valley. Penn State is a member of the Big Ten, one of the "Power Five conferences" in college football. The school began playing football in 1887, and has won two consensus national championships. Many fans in the Philadelphia area also root for the Atlantic Coast Conference-affiliated University of Notre Dame Fighting Irish or the Big Ten-affiliated Rutgers Scarlet Knights.

The University of Pennsylvania, Delaware State University, Villanova University, and the University of Delaware all field Division I FCS football teams; Penn plays in the Ivy League, Delaware State plays in the Mid-Eastern Athletic Conference, and Delaware and Villanova (for football only) are members of the Colonial Athletic Association. The Penn Quakers first played in 1876, and share a claim to six national championships. Villanova, which began playing football in 1894, won the 2009 FCS national championship. Delaware's football team began playing in 1889; the school won the 2003 FCS championship. Delaware State began playing football in 1924, and the school lays claim to the 2007 black college football national championship. Delaware and Villanova have played each other every year since 1988 in the Battle of the Blue, while Delaware and Delaware State have played every year since 2011 in the Route 1 Rivalry.

St. Joseph's, Drexel, and most recently La Salle have all discontinued their football programs. Philadelphia also formerly had a bowl game: from 1959 to 1963, the city hosted the Liberty Bowl, the only cold-weather bowl game of its time. The bowl game moved to Memphis, Tennessee in 1965.

Men's basketball

Philadelphia enjoys a unique basketball rivalry among the Big 5, a group of five local Division I universities: Temple, Saint Joseph's, Penn, Villanova, and La Salle. The Big 5 teams have played many of their games at the Palestra, Penn's venerable gymnasium. The Big 5 rivalry is unique because each of the schools has a rich basketball history and each school is located within a fifteen-mile radius of all of the others. Each of the Big 5 schools has made at least one appearance in the NCAA Final Four, and two have won national titles—La Salle in 1954 and Villanova in 1985, 2016, and 2018. Villanova's victory over Georgetown in the 1985 championship game is widely considered one of the greatest upsets in NCAA basketball history. Temple, Penn, Villanova, and Saint Joseph's all rank among the top 50 Division I teams in number of games won. Three Big 5 players have won the Naismith College Player of the Year award: Lionel Simmons of La Salle in 1990, Jameer Nelson of St. Joseph's in 2004, and Jalen Brunson of Villanova in 2018. Saint Joseph's and La Salle compete in the Atlantic 10, while Penn and Villanova are perennial powers in the Ivy League and the Big East. Temple joined the American Athletic Conference in all sports when the original Big East split into two leagues in 2013 (it had joined Big East football a year earlier). Prior to the Big East split, Temple had been a member of the Atlantic 10, and it still holds the most A-10 basketball tournament championships.

Drexel joined Division I in 1973 and makes up the City 6 in extramurals with the Big 5, and has its own basketball rivalry with Penn, known as the Battle of 33rd Street. The Drexel–Penn rivalry is geographically the closest in NCAA Division I; the two schools' campuses adjoin one another, and their basketball arenas are three blocks apart. Drexel has never made the Final Four, but did reach the second round of the 1996 tournament. Delaware has made five NCAA tournament appearances, reaching the second round in 2014. Delaware State has reached the NCAA tournament once, losing in the first round in 2005. Delaware and Drexel both play in the CAA, while Delaware State plays in the MEAC. Three Philadelphia schools field Division II teams: Chestnut Hill College, Holy Family University, and Thomas Jefferson University (known for sports purposes as Jefferson). The University of the Sciences also fielded a Division II team before it merged into Saint Joseph's University in 2022.

In 1939, Philadelphia hosted the first game of the first NCAA tournament. Philadelphia also hosted the Final Four in 1976 and 1981.

Women's basketball
Women's basketball is another popular college sport in Philadelphia. St. Joseph's, Villanova, and Temple have all appeared at least ten times in the NCAA Women's Division I Basketball Championship tournament, while La Salle, Penn, Drexel, Delaware, and Delaware State have all appeared in at least one tournament. Villanova has advanced further than any other area school, making the Elite Eight in 2003. Immaculata University, a small Catholic school in the Philadelphia suburbs, won the first three AIAW women's basketball tournaments. The three championship teams were collectively inducted into the Basketball Hall of Fame in 2014. One of the players on the Immaculata team, Theresa Grentz, served as head coach of the United States women's national basketball team.

Rowing
Rowing has been popular in Philadelphia since the 18th century. Boathouse Row is a symbol of Philadelphia's rich rowing history, and each Big Five member has its own boathouse. Philadelphia hosts numerous local and collegiate rowing clubs and competitions, including the annual Dad Vail Regatta, the largest intercollegiate rowing event in the U.S., the Stotesbury Cup Regatta, and the Head of the Schuylkill Regatta, all of which are held on the Schuylkill River. The regattas are hosted and organized by the Schuylkill Navy, an association of area rowing clubs that has produced numerous Olympic rowers.

Rugby
Philadelphia has several rugby teams in professional leagues. The Philadelphia Whitemarsh RFC, a rugby union team, was founded in 1985, the Philadelphia Fight, a semi-professional rugby league football team, was founded in 1998, and the Northeast Philadelphia Irish, a team within the Eastern Pennsylvania Rugby Union, was founded in 2011 and has both men and women clubs.

Numerous colleges in the area also offer club rugby teams, with most area teams competing as part of the Eastern Pennsylvania Rugby Union. The Collegiate Rugby Championship (CRC), is a college rugby sevens tournament held every June at Subaru Park near Philadelphia. The CRC is the highest profile college rugby competition in the United States, with the tournament broadcast live on NBC every year. The Collegiate Rugby Championship has succeeded in drawing media attention, corporate sponsorships and attendance.Bleacher Report, NBC to Broadcast Collegiate Sevens Rugby Championship, March 6, 2010, http://bleacherreport.com/articles/358141-nbc-to-broadcast-collegiate-sevens-championshipRugby Mag, Fans Can Make Rugby Work on TV – NBC, May 1, 2012, http://www.rugbymag.com/index.php?option=com_content&view=article&id=4390:fans-can-make-rugby-work-on-tv-nbc&catid=149:usa7s-crc&Itemid=392

Other sports
In addition to basketball, football, and rowing, schools in the Philadelphia area offer other varsity sports. Temple, for example, fields varsity teams in lacrosse, soccer, volleyball, and several other sports. In 1905, Haverford College played in the first modern intercollegiate soccer match. Penn's fencing team has won three national championships. The schools also offer intramural sports.

Semi-pro, amateur, and community teams

Cricket
Cricket has a long history of play in Philadelphia, and Philadelphia was one of the last bastions of cricket in the United States. Philadelphia was the center of the "golden age" of American cricket in the late nineteenth and early twentieth centuries. The Philadelphian cricket team represented Philadelphia in first class cricket from 1878 to 1913, and played against some of the top teams in the world. Players on the team include George Patterson, John Lester, and Bart King, perhaps the greatest American cricket player.

The Philadelphia Cricket Club was founded in 1854. Greats such as Bart King, Percy Clark, and Christie Morris played for the team in its prime. Though it was disbanded in 1924, it was revived in 1998. Other cricket clubs in Germantown, Merion, Belmont flourished during the late 19th and early 20th century.

Since 1993, the city has been home to the annual Philadelphia International Cricket Festival, held during the first weekend in May, benefiting the Inglis Foundation. Each year, twelve teams, including five from the area and seven from across the United States or guest international sides, are invited to participate in the festival.

Rugby league 
Rugby league is an increasingly popular sport in the Philadelphia area. The Philadelphia Fight play in the USA Rugby League. The club has won three USARL championships. The Aston Bulls, Bucks County Sharks, and Delaware Valley Mantarays played in the AMNRL before the league folded in 2013. The Sharks joined the Fight in USARL upon the folding of AMNRL. In 2015, Delaware Black Foxes joined USARL as an expansion team. Aston, Pennsylvania is considered as the birthplace of rugby league in America.

Rugby union
Rugby union is also an increasingly popular sport in the Philadelphia area. Schuylkill River Exiles Rugby Football Club are a Division 1 men's rugby club based in Philadelphia. The team plays matches on public fields in Fairmount Park, and are members of USA Rugby and the Mid-Atlantic Rugby Football Union. The club was founded in 1995. Brandywine Rugby Football Club is a Division 3 Men's Team founded in 1983 Located in Chester county. Media Rugby Football Club is a Division 3 rugby club that was founded in 1978. Media Rugby is a member of USA Rugby and the Mid-Atlantic Rugby Football Union. The Philadelphia Whitemarsh RFC is a division 3 rugby union team in Philadelphia. The team was formed in 1985 after the merging of the Philadelphia and Whitemarsh clubs. The Hibernian RFC formed in 1976 by former Blackthorn RFC players right outside of Philadelphia, in Bucks County. The Northeast Philadelphia Rugby team, also known as the Fish, is a division 3 team in Philadelphia that was formed in 2011.

There are several women's rugby union teams in Philadelphia and the surrounding suburbs. Philadelphia Women's Rugby and Keystone Women's Rugby (in King of Prussia) compete in USA Rugby Division I. Brandywine Women's Rugby (in West Chester) and Doylestown Women's Rugby compete in Division II. Northeast Philadelphia Women's Rugby, associated with the Fish,  joined the EPRU in 2011.

Soccer
The Philadelphia area has a long history of successful amateur soccer teams. The National Amateur Cup has been won several times by Philadelphia teams; winners include Fleisher Yarn, Philadelphia German-Americans, Philadelphia Inter, and Philadelphia United German-Hungarians. The latter club helped found the United Soccer League of Pennsylvania. The Lighthouse Boys Club is a successful club whose history stretches back to the 19th century. Junior Lone Star FC is an amateur soccer team that plays in the National Premier Soccer League. The club is based in Southwest Philadelphia, and was founded in 2001 by West African immigrants, mainly from Liberia. Buxmont Torch FC of Perkasie, Pennsylvania also plays in the NPSL. Reading United A.C., founded in 1996, plays in the Premier Development League. The club has served as an affiliate of the Union since 2009. The Ocean City Nor'easters, founded in 1996, also play in the Premier Development League. The Philadelphia Fever and Philadelphia Liberty FC play in the Women's Premier Soccer League.

Other sports

There are a number of Junior hockey teams in the area. The Flyers sponsor three teams: the Philadelphia Flyers Junior Hockey Club, Philadelphia Little Flyers, and Philadelphia Junior Flyers. The Philadelphia Revolution also play in the area. The Philadelphia Flyers Junior Hockey Club plays in the USPHL, while the other teams play in the EHL.

Penn Jersey Roller Derby is a Philadelphia-based co-ed roller derby league, founded in 2005. They were one of the founding leagues of the Old School Derby Association. The Philly Rollergirls are another Philadelphia-based women's roller derby league, founded in 2005. The Philly Rollergirls are a member of the Women's Flat Track Derby Association, and have been host to the WFTDA East Coast Derby Extravaganza tournament since 2007. The Diamond State Roller Girls is a roller derby league based in Wilmington, Delaware.

The Professional Inline Hockey Association has had several franchises in Philadelphia and the surrounding area, including the Philadelphia Growl. The Philadelphia Phoenix play ultimate in the American Ultimate Disc League, while the Philadelphia Spinners are a Major League Ultimate franchise. The Philadelphia Justice are a professional dodgeball team that has played in the National Dodgeball League since 2011. The United States Australian Football League is represented by the Philadelphia Hawks, since 1998.

Due to a long history of Irish immigration, the Philadelphia area has hosted Gaelic games for over a hundred years. The Philadelphia Division GAA Board is the governing body of Gaelic games in Philadelphia.
Eddie Alvarez is the former Lightweight Champion of both the UFC and Bellator MMA.

Individual sports

Philadelphia's Franklin Field hosts the annual Penn Relays, the largest early-season track and field meet in the United States. One of the busiest streets in the city, Broad Street, is closed to traffic for the annual Broad Street Run, a 10-mile race contested since 1980. The Philadelphia Marathon, founded in 1954, is an annual marathon held on the third Sunday of November. The city also hosts the Philadelphia Distance Run. Philadelphia has also hosted several one-off events or events without a fixed venue, including UFC 101 and UFC 133.  The Wells Fargo Center, Liacouras Center, The Borgata, and other venues in the area host various events. 2300 Arena hosts boxing, mixed martial arts, and professional wrestling events.

Boxing
 
Philadelphia has a rich history in boxing, with the sport having gained popularity in the 1850s. The 2300 Arena is a prominent venue, and was named 2006 Venue of the Year by ESPN2 boxing program Wednesday Night Fights. The Blue Horizon was also a popular venue before it closed in 2010. Another contribution to the city's love of boxing, comes in the form of fiction, with the classic movie Rocky taking place in the city.

Philadelphia has been the home of several prominent boxers. Though born in Beaufort, South Carolina, former world heavyweight champion and Olympic gold medalist Joe Frazier lived in Philadelphia. Frazier owned and managed a Philadelphia boxing gym before his death in 2011. Philadelphia native Bernard Hopkins is a former world middleweight and light-heavyweight champion. Hopkins is perhaps best known for his incredible longevity, as he has remained active in the light heavyweight division well past his 40th birthday. Other prominent boxers from the Philadelphia area include Danny García, Bryant Jennings, Jesse Hart, Tyrell Biggs, Tommy Loughran, Jimmy Young, Randall "Tex" Cobb, Meldrick Taylor, Tyrone Crawley, Steve Cunningham, Buster Drayton, Joey Giardello, Eric Harding, Matthew Saad Muhammad, Harold Johnson, and David Reid. Muhammad Ali and Sonny Liston also lived in Philadelphia during their boxing careers.

Racing

Philadelphia does not currently host any professional automobile racing, but Philadelphia is in close proximity to Dover International Speedway and Pocono Raceway. Defunct racing facilities in the area include Trenton Speedway, Langhorne Speedway, Nazareth Speedway, and Flemington Speedway. Midget car racing was popular during the 1930s and 1940s; the two major tracks were Yellow Jacket Speedway, which closed in 1950, and National Speedway, which closed during World War II as a result of fuel rationing. Races were sanctioned by the American Automobile Association. In 2005, the Champ Car World Series negotiated with the city to organize a race, but no agreement was reached. Philadelphia has produced multiple winners of the Indianapolis 500, including Pete DePaolo, Kelly Petillo, and Bill Holland. Other notable drivers from Philadelphia include Skip Barber, Al Holbert, Spencer Wishart, and Kirk Shelmerdine. Mario Andretti and other members of the Andretti family live in nearby Bethlehem, Pennsylvania.

Horse racing became popular in Philadelphia in the mid-1700s, and successful horses continue to be bred in the Philadelphia area. William Penn, the founder of Philadelphia and Pennsylvania, reportedly raced his horses down the streets of Philadelphia. Man o' War, owned by Philadelphia-area businessman Samuel D. Riddle was named the horse of the century by The Blood-Horse magazine. Riddle also owned Triple Crown-winning horse War Admiral. In 2004, Smarty Jones, who was bred in the Philadelphia area, won the Kentucky Derby and the Preakness Stakes. Other horses with ties to the area include Afleet Alex, Barbaro, Hard Spun, and Lil E. Tee. Parx Casino and Racing hosts numerous horse races, including the Pennsylvania Derby, the Cotillion Handicap, and the Greenwood Cup Stakes. The Atlantic City Race Course also hosts horse racing.

The Manayunk area of the city is home to the annual Philadelphia International Championship bike race.  The main feature of the race is the "Manayunk Wall", an inclined street including all of Levering Avenue and a few blocks of Lyceum Avenue.  The race may have helped promote a local economic revival, and cycling is a prominent theme of many of the shops and restaurants in the area. The women's Liberty Classic is held at the same time and over the same course.

Other sports
Golf has a long history in Philadelphia; the Golf Association of Philadelphia is the oldest regional golf association in the United States. Aronimink Golf Club in Newtown Square, Pennsylvania has hosted several PGA and USGA events, including the 1962 PGA Championship and the 2010 and 2011 AT&T National. Merion Golf Club has hosted five U.S. Opens, most recently in 2013. The Philadelphia PGA Championship and the Philadelphia Open Championship are both hosted in the Philadelphia area. Golfers from the Philadelphia area include Jim Furyk, Dorothy Germain Porter, Jay Sigel, and John McDermott.

Tennis is also a popular sport in Philadelphia. The Philadelphia Freedoms have been a member of World TeamTennis since 2001. The Advanta Championships of Philadelphia were held in Philadelphia from 1971 to 2005, while the Pennsylvania Lawn Tennis Championship was held in Haverford from 1894 to 1974; it was briefly part of the Grand Prix tennis circuit. Tennis players from the Philadelphia area include Dick Williams, Bill Tilden, Ora Washington, and Vic Seixas. Tilden was the first American to win The Championships, Wimbledon and was one of the most prominent sports figures of the first half of the 20th century.

Willie Mosconi, a Philadelphia native, won the World Straight Pool Championship 15 consecutive times. Mosconi is considered one of the greatest pool players in the history of the game.

The Philadelphia Skating Club and Humane Society is the oldest figure skating club in the United States, and was one of the clubs that founded U.S. Figure Skating.

Olympics
Philadelphia bid to host the 1920, 1948, 1952 and 1956 Summer Olympics but lost to Antwerp, London, Helsinki, and Melbourne respectively. As part of the 1980 Summer Olympics boycott, Philadelphia hosted the Liberty Bell Classic. Philadelphia has expressed interest in hosting other Olympic Games, including the 2024 Summer Olympics. Many Philadelphians have competed in the Olympics.

High-school and youth sports
Many high school teams play in the Inter-Academic League, the Philadelphia Catholic League, and the Philadelphia Public League. In 2005, the Philadelphia Public League joined the Pennsylvania Interscholastic Athletic Association. In 2014, Mo'ne Davis was named the Associated Press Female Athlete of the Year for her performance in the 2014 Little League World Series as a member of the Taney Dragons.

People

Numerous notable athletes were born, raised, or attended college in Philadelphia and the Delaware Valley. Basketball players from Philadelphia and the surrounding area include Dawn Staley, Debbie Black, Geoff Petrie, Kobe Bryant, Earl Monroe, Rasheed Wallace, Richard Hamilton, Kyle Lowry, and Elena Delle Donne. Football players from Philadelphia include Herb Adderley, Emlen Tunnell, John Cappelletti, Leroy Kelly, Marvin Harrison, Joe Klecko, Joe Flacco, Matt Ryan, Rich Gannon, and Eddie George. Baseball players from Philadelphia include Mike Trout, Goose Goslin, Roy Campanella, Mickey Vernon, Reggie Jackson, Fred Dunlap, Gertrude Dunn, and Mike Piazza. Hockey players from Philadelphia include Hobey Baker and Mike Richter. Soccer players from Philadelphia include Carli Lloyd, Bobby Convey, and Walter Bahr. Athletes from Philadelphia who played for professional Philadelphia teams include Wilt Chamberlain, Paul Arizin, Tom Gola, Guy Rodgers, Del Ennis, Bucko Kilroy, Johnny Callison, Herb Pennock, and Bucky Walters. Notable coaches from Philadelphia include Dodgers manager Tommy Lasorda, Yankees manager Joe McCarthy, long-time NBA coach Jack Ramsay, UConn women's basketball coach Geno Auriemma, Jefferson basketball coach Herb Magee, Mount St. Mary's coach Jim Phelan, La Salle basketball coach Speedy Morris, Wisconsin basketball coach Bo Ryan, and Temple basketball coach John Chaney.

Olympians from the Philadelphia area include gymnast Mohini Bhardwaj, swimmers Maddy Crippen, Brendan Hansen, David Berkoff, Joe Verdeur, Carl Robie, Ellie Daniel, and John Macionis, track and field athletes Carl Lewis, John Taylor, Jean Shiley, Barney Berlinger, Mel Sheppard, Ted Meredith, Horace Ashenfelter, Leroy Burrell, Kim Gallagher, Bill Toomey, Jon Drummond, Ira Davis, Alvin Kraenzlein, and Mike Powell, rowers Paul Costello, John B. Kelly Sr., and John B. Kelly Jr., figure skater Tara Lipinski, diver Elizabeth Becker-Pinkston, and sailor Don Cohan.

Other prominent Philadelphia sports figures include Flyers owner Ed Snider, Philadelphia Warriors owner Eddie Gottlieb, Sixers director of statistical information Harvey Pollack, Philadelphia Athletics owner Connie Mack, former NFL commissioner Bert Bell, former Phillies general manager Pat Gillick, former Phillies managers Larry Bowa, Charlie Manuel, and Dallas Green, former Flyers coach Fred Shero, former Sixers coaches Alex Hannum and Billy Cunningham, and former Eagles head coaches Andy Reid, Greasy Neale, and Dick Vermeil. Since 2004, many of the most accomplished Philadelphia athletes and sports figures have been inducted into the Philadelphia Sports Hall of Fame.

Sports media

As of 2013, Philadelphia has the fourth largest media market in the United States, with almost three million television homes. NBC Sports Philadelphia is a cable television channel that covers Philadelphia and Delaware Valley sports. It carries most Sixers and Flyers games, along with numerous college sports events. Sister channel NBC Sports Philadelphia Plus carries games when more than one team is playing at the same time. Comcast Sportsnet also carries most Phillies games, although some are carried by WPHL-TV. All three teams occasionally appear on national television. The Eagles usually play on WTXF-TV Fox, although games can also appear on CBS, NBC, ESPN, and the NFL Network. Philadelphia also has the sports radio station WTEL, as well as numerous other sports radio broadcasts.

Prominent members of the sports media (past and present) include Richie Ashburn (who also played for the Phillies), Gene Hart, Harry Kalas, Merrill Reese, Jayson Stark, Jack Whitaker, Bill Campbell, Ray Didinger, Phil Jasner, Bill Conlin, Michael Barkann, Angelo Cataldi ,Mike Missanelli and Howard Eskin. The Philadelphia Sports Writers Association presents annual awards.

Several films have depicted sports in Philadelphia. Most prominently, the Rocky film franchise follows the boxing career of Rocky Balboa, first as a fighter and later as a trainer. The film Invincible was based on Vince Papale's career as a player on the Philadelphia Eagles. The Garbage Picking Field Goal Kicking Philadelphia Phenomenon starred Tony Danza as the kicker of the Philadelphia Eagles. Broad Street Bullies is a documentary that chronicles the early history of the Philadelphia Flyers. The film Pride follows swim coach Jim Ellis in 1970s Philadelphia. The Mighty Macs depicts the 1970s Immaculata College women's basketball teams of the early 1970s. The main character of the film Silver Linings Playbook'' is an Eagles fan who closely follows the 2008 Eagles season throughout the film.

See also

Philadelphia Sports Hall of Fame

Notes

References

Further reading
Philadelphia Sports Hall of Fame Roll Call of Champions